Berlin-Tempelhof-Schöneberg is an electoral constituency (German: Wahlkreis) represented in the Bundestag. It elects one member via first-past-the-post voting. Under the current constituency numbering system, it is designated as constituency 81. It is located in southern Berlin, comprising the Tempelhof-Schöneberg borough.

Berlin-Tempelhof-Schöneberg was created for the 2002 federal election. Since 2021, it has been represented by Kevin Kühnert of the Social Democratic Party (SPD).

Geography
Berlin-Tempelhof-Schöneberg is located in southern Berlin. As of the 2021 federal election, it is coterminous with the Tempelhof-Schöneberg borough.

History
Berlin-Tempelhof-Schöneberg was created in 2002, replacing the abolished constituency of Berlin-Tempelhof and containing parts of the abolished Berlin-Kreuzberg-Schöneberg constituency. In the 2002 through 2009 elections, it was constituency 82 in the numbering system. Since the 2013 election, it has been number 81. Its borders have not changed since its creation.

Members
The constituency was first represented by Eckhardt Barthel of the Social Democratic Party (SPD) in from 2002 to 2005, followed by Mechthild Rawert until 2009. Jan-Marco Luczak of the Christian Democratic Union (CDU) was elected in 2009, and re-elected in 2013 and 2017. Kevin Kühnert won the constituency for the SPD in 2021.

Election results

2021 election

2017 election

2013 election

2009 election

References

Federal electoral districts in Berlin
Tempelhof-Schöneberg
2002 establishments in Germany
Constituencies established in 2002